was the thirty-seventh of the fifty-three stations of the Tōkaidō. It is located in the present-day city of Okazaki, in Aichi Prefecture, Japan. Another accepted reading for this post town is "Fujikawa-juku."

At its peak, Fujikawa-juku was home to 302 buildings, including one honjin, one sub-honjin and 36 hatago. Its total population was approximately 1,200 people. The classic ukiyo-e print by Andō Hiroshige (Hōeidō edition) from 1831 to 1834 depicts a daimyō procession on sankin-kōtai entering the post station, which would have been a common occurrence. Three commoners are shown as kneeling as the lord's retinue passes.  
The Okazaki city government has been working actively on preserving this old post town as a tourist destination. In addition to creating the Fujikawa-shuku Archives Museum within the preserved waki-honjin, detailing the history of the post town,  the city has preserved a number of old structures such old street lights, and traditional houses with lattice windows. A line of old pine trees extending for approximately a kilometer marks the location of the Tōkaidō road.

Neighboring post towns
Tōkaidō
Akasaka-juku - Fujikawa-shuku - Okazaki-shuku

Further reading
Carey, Patrick. Rediscovering the Old Tokaido:In the Footsteps of Hiroshige. Global Books UK (2000). 
Chiba, Reiko. Hiroshige's Tokaido in Prints and Poetry. Tuttle. (1982) 
Taganau, Jilly. The Tokaido Road: Travelling and Representation in Edo and Meiji Japan. RoutledgeCurzon (2004).

References

Stations of the Tōkaidō
Stations of the Tōkaidō in Aichi Prefecture